Stup Interchange  is a cloverleaf interchange in Sarajevo. It connects two different routes and some important locations in the largest city in Bosnia and Herzegovina. Stup Interchange is connecting Sarajevo International Airport with M17 Road, A1 Motorway, Western Sarajevo (Ilidža), Dobrinja, Boljakov Potok, Rajlovac Industrial Zone and Center of city.

In 2014, the interchange was fully reconstructed for 25 Million € and is one of the most frequented interchanges in the Balkans with more than 60.000 vehicles each day.

In the middle of the interchange is an important and highly frequented tram station which can be accessed by using modern passenger underpass with escalators.

Road interchanges
Roads in Bosnia and Herzegovina